The 2012 United States House of Representatives elections in Idaho were held on Tuesday, November 6, 2012 and elected two U.S. Representatives, one from each of the state's two congressional districts. The elections coincided with those of other federal and state offices, including a quadrennial presidential election. Candidate filing took place between February 27 and March 9, 2012. Primary elections were held on May 15, 2012.

Overview

Redistricting
Although Idaho's overall population grew by more than 20 percent during the period between 2000 and 2010, more significant growth elsewhere meant the state did not gain extra representation in the House of Representatives, instead remaining at two seats. The 2010 United States Census found that the population of the 1st district, which previously comprised the state's western and northern counties, as well as parts of Ada County including much of western Boise, had 116,278 more residents than the 2nd district, which included the rest of Boise, the Magic Valley region and the state's eastern counties. This shift in population meant that the 2nd district, currently represented by Republican Mike Simpson, would include more of Ada County beginning in 2012 and up through the 2020 Congressional election.

In October 2011 the Idaho Commission on Redistricting approved by a 4-2 vote a Congressional district map which moved the district boundary in Boise west from Cole Road to Cloverdale Road. This placed almost all of Boise in the 2nd district, with only a few far western neighborhoods remaining in the 1st district. Other Ada County cities including Meridian, Eagle, Star, Kuna and Garden City remained in the 1st district. No changes were made to Congressional district boundaries outside Ada County. 

On January 18, 2012, the Idaho Supreme Court struck down the redistricting plan approved by the Commission on Redistricting in October 2011 on the grounds that it violated the Idaho Constitution. The commission reconvened on January 26, 2012, to make necessary revisions which were approved the following day. The commission's January 2012 changes dealt solely with state legislative districts, leaving the original Congressional redistricting plan intact.

District 1

Republican Raúl Labrador, who was first elected to represent the 1st district in 2010, will run for re-election.

Republican primary

Candidates

Nominee
 Raúl Labrador, incumbent U.S. Representative

Eliminated in primary
 Reed McCandless, truck driver

Primary results

Democratic primary

Candidates

Nominee
 Jimmy Farris, former NFL player

Eliminated in primary
 Cynthia Clinkingbeard, former physician and college professor

Declined
 Walt Minnick, former U.S. Representative

Primary results

Libertarian primary

Candidates

Nominee
Rob Oates, chairman of the Libertarian Party of Idaho and former member of the Caldwell City Council

Independents
Pro-Life, a perennial candidate formerly known as Marvin Richardson, ran as an Independent.

General election

Results

District 2

Republican Mike Simpson, who had represented the 2nd district since 1999, ran for re-election.

Republican primary

Candidates

Nominee
 Mike Simpson, incumbent U.S. Representative

Eliminated in primary
 Chick Heileson, businessman and candidate for this seat in 2010

Withdrew
 John Baird, businessman

Declined
 Janice McGeachin, State representative

Primary results

Democratic primary

Candidates

Nominee
 Nicole LeFavour, State Senator

Eliminated in primary
 Jack Wayne Chappell

Withdrawn
 Eldon Wallace, nominee for Lieutenant Governor in 2010

Primary results

General election

Results

References

External links
State of Idaho, Office of Elections government site
Idaho Votes government site
United States House of Representatives elections in Idaho, 2012 at Ballotpedia
Idaho U.S. House at OurCampaigns.com
Campaign contributions for U.S. Congressional races in Idaho at OpenSecrets
Outside spending at the Sunlight Foundation

Idaho
2012
United StatesHouse of Representatives